Charaña Municipality is the fifth municipal section of the Pacajes Province in the  La Paz Department, Bolivia. Its seat is Charaña.

Geography 
Some of the highest mountains of the municipality are listed below:

 Ch'iyara Salla
 Jach'a Kunturiri
 Kunturiri
 K'illima Parki
 Laram Q'awa (Charaña)
 Laram Q'awa (Río Blanco)
 Phaq'u Q'awa
 Tatitu Qullu
 Wayra Lupi Qullu

Climate
The climate in Charaña is characterized by a sub-freezing mean annual temperature, with large annual temperature ranges, and moderately low precipitation. The Köppen Climate System classifies this as a Tundra climate, abbreviated as ET.
<div style="width:75%;">

References 

 www.ine.gov.bo / census 2001: Charaña Municipality

Municipalities of La Paz Department (Bolivia)